Black Skylands is an open world top-down shooter video game developed by Russian indie video game company Hungry Couch Games. The game was published by tinyBuild as an Early Access title for Microsoft Windows on 9 July 2021.

The game is set in the fictional floating continent of Aspya, revolving around the adventure of female protagonist called Eva. As a daughter of the head of farmer/gatherer clan called Earners, Eva is set to defend the land of Aspya from the terror of a band of raiders called Kain's Falcons and, at the same time, the phantom menace of mysterious creatures called The Swarm appearing from the storm. Billed as a "skypunk that combines elements of Open World, Sandbox, Top-Down Shooter and Action/Adventure", the game boasts the ability for players to customize their weapons and airship, build their base, reclaim lands and expand their territory, and explore dungeons, including randomly generated ones. Black Skylands has been described by reviewers as a mix between Hotline Miami, Sunless Skies, and Stardew Valley.

References

External links
 

2021 video games
Fantasy video games
Action video games
Shoot 'em ups
Open-world video games
Steampunk video games
Video games about pirates
Video games featuring female protagonists
Video games using procedural generation
Early access video games
Windows games
Windows-only games
Single-player video games
Video games developed in Russia
Indie video games
Top-down video games